State Highway 283 (SH 283) is a Texas state highway that runs from U.S. Highway 380 at Old Glory southeast to U.S. Highway 277 near Stamford.  This route was originally designated on September 26, 1939 from the Oklahoma state line south through Quanah, Crowell, Benjamin, and Rule to Sagerton as a renumbering of part of SH 16. On July 31, 1975, the entire route was transferred to SH 6, while SH 283 was transferred from the old route of SH 6 from Stamford northwest to Old Glory.

Route description
SH 283 begins at a junction with US 380.  It heads southeast from this junction to an intersection with FM 1835.  The highway continues to the southeast to an intersection with FM 1661.  Heading towards the southeast, the highway continues to a junction with SH 6.  SH 283 begins to run concurrently with SH 6 until it reaches its eastern terminus at US 277 in Stamford.

Junction list

References

283
Transportation in Stonewall County, Texas
Transportation in Haskell County, Texas